Park Krakowski is a  city park located in Kraków, in southern Poland. The park, founded in 1885, was modelled after similar parks in Vienna. It is a contemporary sculpture park.

History
Park Krakowski was originated by city councillor Stanisław Rehman. It was built on grounds leased from the Polish military.  It was a popular destination point with many Fin de siècle Cracovians. After World War I, its size was reduced, due to rapid real estate development.

Features
The park originally contained:
an outdoor concert bowl amphitheatre 
a summer outdoor theater (built 1890)
a zoo
an ice skating rink and bicycle rink
a swimming pool and pond
a bowling alley
a restaurant and seasonal outdoor cafés.

From the original 1885 design, the only remaining built features are landscape tower elements, and the ornamental pond with its fountain.

Sculpture park
Park Krakowski has been a sculpture park since 1974. It has numerous abstract outdoor sculptures on display throughout the park grounds.

They were created by Polish modern art sculptors, including: S. Borzęcki; A. Hajducki; W. Kućma; J. Sękowski; and J. Siek.

References

Ryszard Burek - editor, Encyklopedia Krakowa, 2000,

External links

Essential Krakow • Park Krakowski — " Things to do in Krakow".
Park Krakowski Fountain — on Vimeo

Parks in Kraków
Sculpture gardens, trails and parks in Europe
Fountains in Poland
1885 establishments in Austria-Hungary